"A Man's a Man for A' That", also known as "Is There for Honest Poverty" or "For a' That and a' That", is a 1795 song by Robert Burns, written in Scots and English, famous for its expression of egalitarian ideas of society, which may be seen as expressing the ideas of republicanism that arose in the 18th century.

Scottish folksinger Sheena Wellington sang the song at the opening of the Scottish Parliament in May, 1999. Midge Ure did the same in July 2016. The song was also sung at the funeral of Donald Dewar, the inaugural First Minister of Scotland. It is also known in translations into other European languages, for example the German "" by Ferdinand Freiligrath, which was widely used during the German Revolutions of 1848.

The words "pride o' worth" appear on the crest of the Scottish Qualifications Authority.

Poem
Is there for honest Poverty
That hings his head, an' a' that;
The coward slave - we pass him by,
We dare be poor for a' that!
For a' that, an' a' that.
Our toils obscure an' a' that,
The rank is but the guinea's stamp,
The Man's the gowd for a' that.

What though on hamely fare we dine,
Wear hodden grey, an' a that;
Gie fools their silks, and knaves their wine;
A Man's a Man for a' that:
For a' that, and a' that,
Their tinsel show, an' a' that;
The honest man, tho' e'er sae poor,
Is king o' men for a' that.

Ye see yon birkie, ca'd a lord,
Wha struts, an' stares, an' a' that;
Tho' hundreds worship at his word,
He's but a coof for a' that:
For a' that, an' a' that,
His ribband, star, an' a' that:
The man o' independent mind
He looks an' laughs at a' that.

A prince can mak a belted knight,
A marquis, duke, an' a' that;
But an honest man's abon his might,
Gude faith, he maunna fa' that!
For a' that, an' a' that,
Their dignities an' a' that;
The pith o' sense, an' pride o' worth,
Are higher rank than a' that.

Then let us pray that come it may,
(As come it will for a' that,)
That Sense and Worth, o'er a' the earth,
Shall bear the gree, an' a' that.
For a' that, an' a' that,
It's coming yet for a' that,
That Man to Man, the world o'er,
Shall brothers be for a' that.

Recordings
 Earl Robinson covered it on his 1963 album Earl Robinson Sings
 The Corries played it on Scotland Will Flourish, their 1985 live album
 The Old Blind Dogs covered this song on their 2001 album Fit?
 Paolo Nutini covered this song for BBC Scotland at the Barrowland Ballroom, Glasgow, in 2007
 Marc Gunn covered it on his 2013 album Scottish Songs of Drinking & Rebellion
 The Mudmen covered it on their 2012 album Donegal Danny
 Dougie MacLean covered it on his 1995 album ' 'Tribute' '

See also 
 Scottish national identity
 Scottish republicanism

References

External links 

The Lyrics and the melody

18th-century songs
Scottish literature
Poetry by Robert Burns
Scots-language works
Ballads
Egalitarianism
Liberalism
Socialism
Scottish patriotic songs
Scottish republicanism
Songs with lyrics by Robert Burns
1795 songs
1790s in Scotland